Cássio Petry (born May 12, 1978 in Três Coroas) is a Brazilian slalom canoer who has competed since the mid-1990s. He was eliminated in the qualifying round of the C-1 event at the 2000 Summer Olympics in Sydney after finishing in 14th place.

References
Sports-Reference.com profile

1978 births
Brazilian male canoeists
Canoeists at the 2000 Summer Olympics
Living people
Olympic canoeists of Brazil